Nakayama Zenye (中山 善衞, July 7, 1932 – June 24, 2014) was the third Shinbashira of Tenrikyo. He was the first son of Nakayama Shōzen, the second Shinbashira, and the great-great-grandson of Nakayama Miki, the foundress of Tenrikyo. He held the office from November 14, 1967 until April 26, 1998.

Further reading
  

Tenrikyo
Japanese religious leaders
1932 births
2014 deaths